Leon Stein (1912 in Baltimore, Maryland – February 13, 1990 in Delray Beach, Florida) was an American writer and longtime editor of Justice, the official newspaper of the International Ladies' Garment Workers' Union (ILGWU).

Biography
Born in Baltimore, Leon Stein moved from New York City as a child and made his home there. By the time he was graduated from the City College of New York in 1934, he had worked in a laundry, for the subway, as a waiter in a Catskill resort and as a ladies' garment cutter, and after his graduation he returned to the garment industry as a cutter and patternmaker.

In 1939, Mr. Stein began writing a regular feature for Justice, the publication of the ILGWU, and soon was made copy editor and, later, assistant editor of the magazine; in 1952, he assumed responsibilities as editor, which he maintained until 1977.

Under Mr. Stein's editorship, Justice received many honors, including, in 1959, the distinction of being chosen by the University of California School of Journalism as the outstanding trade union publication in the country. He coedited, with Max Danish, a documentary history of the International Ladies' Garment Workers' Union and helped edit an anthology of writing from the labor press.

References 

This biography was adapted from the dust jacket of the 1962 edition of The Triangle Fire, written by Leon Stein, and published by J.R. Lippincott & Co.

External links
 Leon Stein interviews about Triangle Shirtwaist Factory fire
 Guide to the ILGWU. Leon Stein papers. 5780/087. Kheel Center for Labor-Management Documentation and Archives, Martin P. Catherwood Library, Cornell University. 
 Triangle Fire Open Archive: Leon Stein at NYU

American trade unionists
1912 births
1990 deaths
City College of New York alumni
Writers from Baltimore